Ivesia callida is a rare species of flowering plant, in the rose family, known by the common name Tahquitz mousetail. It is a small perennial herb which forms matted patches of hanging foliage on cliff faces. The leaves are strips of oval-shaped green leaflets. Each leaf is up to 7 centimeters long and has several pairs of hairy, glandular leaflets. The thin, green, hanging stems grow up to 15 centimeters long and bear an inflorescence of several flowers. Each flower has five hairy, pointed sepals and five round to oval white petals. The center of the flower contains twenty stamens with disc-shaped anthers and several pistils.

The plant is endemic to the San Jacinto Mountains of Riverside County, California, where it is known from only two occurrences. The plant grows in cracks and crevices of granite mountain cliffs. It was named for Tahquitz Rock, a rock formation in its endemic range. The rock formation was named for the Native American spirit Tahquitz.

External links
Jepson Manual Treatment: Ivesia callida
Ivesia callida — U.C. Photo gallery

callida
Endemic flora of California
Flora of Riverside County, California
Natural history of the Peninsular Ranges
Flora and fauna of the San Jacinto Mountains
Critically endangered flora of California